Robert Wilkins was a blues musician (1896–1987).

Robert or Bob Wilkins may also refer to:

Robert L. Wilkins (born 1963), United States judge
Robert Wallace Wilkins (1906–2003), American medical investigator and educator
Bobby Wilkins (1922–2010), baseball shortstop
Bob Wilkins (1932–2009), television personality

See also
Robert Wilkin (disambiguation)